Dusablon is a surname. Notable people with the surname include:

Benoît Dusablon (born 1979), Canadian ice hockey player
Jade Dusablon (born 1994), Canadian long-distance swimmer